There is a body of films featuring stellar eclipses and eclipses of natural satellites. Compared to other astronomical events featured in films, such as full moons and asteroid strikes, solar eclipses are less commonly seen. When they have featured in films, they often drive the plot and have a portentous presence. NPR's Glen Weldon said that films use eclipses "to signal to audiences that the normal rules have temporarily lifted, and things are about to get weird". The first film to feature a solar eclipse was the 1907 silent film The Eclipse, or the Courtship of the Sun and Moon that featured a solar eclipse as a fantastical consummation between the sun and the moon. Eclipses have been seen as bad omens throughout history, so filmmakers leverage that belief "as visual cues or key plot points", according to The Oregonians Amy Wang. The most accurate depiction of a solar eclipse in film is seen in the 1961 religious epic film Barabbas due to the filming of an actual solar eclipse during its crucifixion scene (see solar eclipse of February 15, 1961).

List of films

References

External links
How solar eclipses are used in TV and film at BirthMoviesDeath.com
The Oldest Film of a Solar Eclipse Has Been Restored and Released Online at Smithsonian

Films featuring eclipses, List of
Eclipses, list of films featuring